Joseph Paul Overton (4 January 1960 – 30 June 2003) was an American political scientist who served as the senior vice president of the Mackinac Center for Public Policy. He is best known for his work in the mid-1990s developing an idea since known as the Overton window.

Biography
Overton was born in Southwestern Michigan, but his family moved to Midland, Michigan in 1965 for a job with the Dow Chemical Company. He graduated from Herbert Henry Dow High School in 1978.

He held a bachelor of science degree in electrical engineering from Michigan Technological University and a Juris Doctor degree from the Thomas M. Cooley Law School at Western Michigan University.

Overton was admitted to the State Bar of Michigan in 1994. He was appointed to the Michigan Appellate Defender Commission by Governor John Engler. His appointment was recommended by the Michigan Supreme Court. Before joining the Mackinac Center, he worked as a quality specialist, project manager and electrical engineer at the Dow Chemical Company in Midland, Michigan.

Overton was an ardent libertarian, and while associated with the Mackinaw Center in Midland, he promoted and studied free-market principles for over ten years while travelling to more than a dozen countries in Europe, Asia, Africa and South America. One of his other responsibilities was fund-raising. In order to explain what think tanks do, in the 1990s he designed a brochure to illustrate the range of policies politically acceptable to the mainstream at a given time. That idea eventually became known as the Overton window, and his lasting legacy. He opined that it is the responsibility of think-tanks to propose policies outside the window and shift the window.

In 1998, Overton was honored with the Roe Award from the State Policy Network (SPN) at their meeting in Atlanta, Georgia. The award, presented annually, honors individuals who have successfully promoted free market philosophy while displaying innovation, accomplishment and innovation in public policy.

He died at age 43 from injuries suffered in a crash while piloting an ultralight aircraft, soon after taking off from the Tuscola Area Airport near Caro, Michigan. Overton had just married a few weeks before the accident.

Shortly after his death, he was honored by the State Policy Network with the creation of the Overton Award, a special distinction. It is bestowed infrequently and limited to COOs or Executive VPs of non-profit, free market organizations who demonstrate the personal qualities that Overton possessed. These include humility in supporting their peers, leadership that builds a great team, and developing effective strategies that magnify the ideas and influence of their organization. As of 2022, only five individuals had received this honor.

See also
Overton Award

References

External links
Think Tank Leader Dies In Plane Crash
Joseph P. Overton — biographic overview

1960 births
2003 deaths
20th-century American philosophers
Political philosophers
Victims of aviation accidents or incidents in the United States
Western Michigan University Cooley Law School alumni
Michigan Technological University alumni
Mackinac Center for Public Policy
People from Midland, Michigan